14th TFCA Awards
December 14, 2010

Best Film: 
 The Social Network 
The 14th Toronto Film Critics Association Awards, honoring the best in film for 2010, were given on December 14, 2010.

Winners
Best Actor:
Jesse Eisenberg – The Social Network 
Runners-Up: Colin Firth – The King's Speech and James Franco – 127 Hours

Best Actress:
Jennifer Lawrence – Winter's Bone
Runners-Up: Natalie Portman – Black Swan and Michelle Williams – Blue Valentine

Best Animated Film: 
How to Train Your Dragon
Runners-Up: Despicable Me and Toy Story 3

Best Director: 
David Fincher – The Social Network 
Runners-Up: Darren Aronofsky – Black Swan and Christopher Nolan – Inception

Best Documentary Film: 
Exit Through the Gift Shop
Runners-Up: Inside Job and Marwencol

Best Film:
The Social Network
Runners-Up: Black Swan and Uncle Boonmee Who Can Recall His Past Lives

Best First Feature: 
Exit Through the Gift Shop
Runners-Up: Get Low and Monsters

Best Foreign Language Film: 
Uncle Boonmee Who Can Recall His Past Lives • Thailand
Runners-Up: Mother • South Korea and Of Gods and Men • France

Best Screenplay:
The Social Network – Aaron Sorkin 
Runners-Up: The King's Speech – David Seidler and True Grit – Joel and Ethan Coen

Best Supporting Actor:
Armie Hammer – The Social Network
Runners-Up: Christian Bale – The Fighter and Geoffrey Rush – The King's Speech

Best Supporting Actress:
Hailee Steinfeld – True Grit
Runners-Up: Amy Adams – The Fighter and Melissa Leo – The Fighter

Jay Scott Prize for Emerging Talent:
Daniel Cockburn
Special Citation:
to Bruce McDonald, who directed four movies in 2010: This Movie Is Broken, Trigger, Music from the Big House and Hard Core Logo 2
Rogers Canadian Film Award:
Incendies
Runners-Up: Splice and Trigger

References

2010
2010 film awards
2010 in Toronto
2010 in Canadian cinema